Toffa Cotonou is a football club of Benin, based in the town of Cotonou. They played in the Beninese first division, the Benin Premier League.

In 1995 the team has won the Benin Premier League.

Achievements
Benin Premier League: 1
1995

Performance in CAF competitions

Stadium
Currently the team plays at the 15000 capacity Stade Charles de Gaulle.

Current squad

References

External links
CAF

Football clubs in Benin